Roy James Pack (born 20 September 1946) is an English former professional footballer who played as a full back.

Career
Born in Stoke Newington, Pack joined Arsenal in 1962. He later played for Portsmouth, making 91 appearances in the Football League for them, before playing in South Africa with Cape Town City. He spent the 1969–70 season with Oxford United, but left without making an appearance, due to injury.

References

1946 births
Living people
Footballers from Stoke Newington
English footballers
Association football defenders
Arsenal F.C. players
Portsmouth F.C. players
Cape Town City F.C. (NFL) players
Oxford United F.C. players
English Football League players
National Football League (South Africa) players